Vanda Oleksandrivna Maslovska (Ванда Олександрівна Масловська, born ) is a retired Ukrainian female weightlifter, competing in the 69 kg category and representing Ukraine at international competitions. 

She participated at the 2004 Summer Olympics in the 69 kg event. 
She competed at world championships, most recently at the 2003 World Weightlifting Championships.

Major results

References

External links
 
http://www.olympiandatabase.com/index.php?id=41677&L=1
http://www.todor66.com/weightlifting/World/2002/Women_under_69kg.html
http://www.gettyimages.com/event/olympics-day-6-weightlifting-51086700#chunhong-liu-of-china-celebrates-after-a-successful-lift-during-the-picture-id51196447
http://www.alamy.com/stock-photo-vanda-maslovska-of-ukraine-waves-to-the-crowd-as-she-receives-her-120412267.html

1980 births
Living people
Ukrainian female weightlifters
Weightlifters at the 2004 Summer Olympics
Olympic weightlifters of Ukraine
Place of birth missing (living people)
21st-century Ukrainian women